Leonardo Antonio Espinoza Nova (born 1 July 1986) was a Chilean footballer.

References

1986 births
Living people
Chilean footballers
Chilean Primera División players
Club Deportivo Palestino footballers
Ñublense footballers
O'Higgins F.C. footballers
Deportes Colchagua footballers
Association football midfielders